Trianaea is a genus of the plant family Solanaceae. It occurs in Colombia, Ecuador and Peru. It is placed in the subfamily Solanoideae, tribe Juanulloeae.

Species
, Plants of the World Online accepted three species:
Trianaea brevipes (Cuatrec.) S.Knapp
Trianaea naeka S.Knapp
Trianaea nobilis Planch. & Linden

References

Solanoideae
Taxonomy articles created by Polbot
Solanaceae genera